Daniel George Paraschiv (born 24 April 1999) is a Romanian professional footballer who plays as a striker for Liga I club Hermannstadt.

Club career

Early career
Paraschiv is a product of his hometown club FC Brașov, for which he played as a junior until it folded in 2017. The same year, he recorded his debut as a senior with Viitorul Ghimbav in the third division. He also represented AFC Hărman before moving to Liga II side Luceafărul Oradea in the 2018–19 season, where he amassed 33 games and 14 goals in the league championship.

In the summer of 2019, Paraschiv moved to fellow Liga II team Viitorul Târgu Jiu, but only made two appearances during his first campaign in Oltenia. He regained his form in the 2020–21 season, managing to score 13 times from 29 matches in all competitions.

CFR Cluj
Liga I club CFR Cluj announced the signing of Paraschiv on 11 June 2021, but the following month he was loaned out to Voluntari, also in the top tier. He recorded his Liga I debut on 19 July, in a 2–3 away loss to Dinamo București.

Paraschiv netted his only Voluntari goal on 21 September 2021, in a 4–1 defeat of Șomuz Fălticeni in the Cupa României. On 10 January 2022, he moved back to the second division on loan at Hermannstadt, which he aided in achieving promotion to the Liga I after scoring six goals in 13 appearances.

Hermannstadt
In June 2022, Paraschiv moved to Hermannstadt on a permanent basis after signing a three-year contract. He scored his first Liga I goal on 15 July, in a 3–0 success over Mioveni. Paraschiv went on to net eight more times by the turn of the year, including goals against title contenders FCSB, Universitatea Craiova and CFR Cluj, respectively.

In February 2023, Ukrainian Premier League club Dynamo Kyiv bid €1.2 million for the transfer of Paraschiv; Hermannstadt accepted the offer, however the player rejected the move because of the ongoing Russian invasion of Ukraine.

International career
Paraschiv recorded his debut for the Romania national team on 20 November 2022, coming on as a 70th-minute substitute for George Pușcaș in a 5–0 friendly thrashing of Moldova. After only one minute, he scored his side's fourth goal by converting a penalty kick.

Personal life
Paraschiv's parents and brother were born in the Republic of Moldova.

Career statistics

International

Scores and results list Romania's goal tally first, score column indicates score after each Paraschiv goal.

References

External links

1999 births
Living people
Sportspeople from Brașov
Romanian people of Moldovan descent
Romanian footballers
Association football forwards
Liga I players
Liga II players
Liga III players
CS Luceafărul Oradea players
ACS Viitorul Târgu Jiu players
CFR Cluj players
FC Voluntari players
FC Hermannstadt players
Romania youth international footballers
Romania international footballers